Fahman Sports & Cultural Club is a Yemeni football team playing at the top level. It is founded in 1969 and is based in Mudiyah in the Abyan Governorate. Their home stadium is Mudiyah Stadium.

Achievements
Yemeni League: 1
2022

References

Fahman
Association football clubs established in 1969
1969 establishments in Yemen